S.O.S.A. (Save Our Streets AZ) is a compilation album made to promote AZ's then-upcoming album 9 Lives. It features ten tracks, and has songs that are not found on AZ's other albums along with songs that ended up making it on the 9 Lives album. It was distributed in the streets, as AZ was a free agent at the time and was in the process of finding a new label after Noo Trybe Records let him go.

Track listing
 "Intro"
 "I Don't Give a Fuck Now"
 "Problems"
 "Bodies Gotta Get Caught"
 "Let Us Toast"
 "Platinum Bars"
 "Love Me in Your Special Way"
 "That's Real" (featuring Beanie Sigel)
 "Animal Skit (You Ain't from Brooklyn)"
 "It B's Like That" (featuring Animal)

Samples
Problems
"All This Love" by Debarge
Let Us Toast
"I Forgot to Be Your Lover" by The Mad Lads
Love Me in Your Special Way
"Love Me in a Special Way" by DeBarge

2000 compilation albums
AZ (rapper) albums